The Helium Network is a decentralized wireless Internet of Things (IoT) network using the LoRaWAN system, tied to the cryptocurrency Helium Network Token (symbol HNT). Nodes on the network are generally owned and placed by individuals in their homes or offices, and they are rewarded for their participation in the network in payments of HNT. The network aims to provide connectivity to IoT sensor devices in areas where wireless or mobile coverage is minimal, or requires too much power.

History
The Helium Network was begun by Helium, Inc. in 2013 as a network of LoRa gateway hotspots which could be deployed throughout an area by agreements with building owners, typically paid in conventional currency. In 2017, the company's funds were running low, so it switched to a new strategy: offering individuals payment in cryptocurrency to operate individually owned nodes in their homes or offices. These individually owned nodes are purchased at costs of up to $500 each, and the payments to owners vary based on data usage but can be as low as $.10 a month.  Hotspot operators would also have a vote in the operation of the network. In 2022, Helium Inc. rebranded to Nova Labs Inc. and raised $200million in a funding round led by Tiger Global Management and Andreessen Horowitz.

Reports in July 2022 revealed that Helium had falsely claimed Lime and Salesforce as two of their major customers for years, despite neither company having a formal relationship with Helium or using the network.

See also 
 LoRa
 FreedomFi

References

External links 
 

2018 establishments
Internet of things companies
Cryptocurrency projects
Currencies introduced in 2018